Michele Antonio del Vasto (26 March 1495 – 18 October 1528) was the Marquess of Saluzzo from 1504 until his death.

Born in Saluzzo, the elder son of Ludovico II of Saluzzo and Margaret of Foix-Candale, he was Count of Carmagnola until he succeeded to his father. He took part, initially alongside Ludovico, in the Italian Wars of Louis XII and Francis I of France. In particular, he distinguished himself at the Battle of Pavia (1525).

Michele Antonio died from wounds sustained by a cannonball at the Battle of Aversa.  According to his last will, he was buried in the church of Santa Maria in Aracoeli in Rome, while his heart was kept in Piedmont.

A ballad about the wounded marquess explaining his last will was popular among the Italian Alpini during World War I.

See also
Italian War of 1521-1526

Notes

References

Sources

1495 births
1528 deaths
Michele Antonio
Michele Antonio
Deaths by firearm in Italy
Military personnel killed in action
People of the Italian Wars
16th-century Italian nobility